Hesseln is a railway station located in Hesseln, Germany. The station is on the Osnabrück–Brackwede railway. The train services are operated by NordWestBahn.

Train services
The following services currently call at Hesseln:

Notes 

Railway stations in North Rhine-Westphalia